The 423rd Guards Yampolsky Motor Rifle Regiment is a regiment of the Soviet Army and Russian Ground Forces. For most of the post-war period, it is a part of the 4th Guards Tank Division.

History
The 31st Motorised Brigade was formed in June 1942 under the 17th Tank Corps. On 2 January 1943, the brigade was renamed as the 3rd Guards Yampolsky Motor Rifle of Suvorov and Kutuzov.

Within three years of participation in the German-Soviet War, the brigade fought from the Don to Elbe rivers, from the city of Voronezh to the walls of Prague, inflicting heavy damage against enemy forces. For their actions, 19 members of the brigade received distinctions as Hero of Soviet Union.

Since 11 September 1945 a place of a constant disposition of a regiment - Naro-Fominsk, Moscow Region.

On 5 May 1957 the regiment was renamed as the 423rd Guards Yampolsky Motor Rifle of Suvorov and Kutuzov's awards of II degree a regiment. The regiment has grown up 12 commanders of divisions, 2 deputy ministers of defence.

Since 11 September 1999 - 28 March 2000 The regimental tactical group 423rd regiment carried out a problem on constitutional order prompting in territory to the Chechen republic.

The Regiment participated in the assault of the city of Grozny, the battle for the village of Komsomolskoye. Loss of the regiment were 27 people.

In 2000, 2001, 2002 the regiment admitted the best regiment in Moscow Military District.

On 21 June the part celebrates an annual holiday of formation of a regiment. The regiment was disbanded in April 2009 when the division became a brigade.

Reportedly, the regiment is taking part in the Russian invasion of Ukraine.

Last structure
As of 2007, the Yampolsky Regiment consisted of the following units:
 1st Motorised Battalion, Naro-Fominsk
 2nd Motorised Battalion, Naro-Fominsk
 3rd Motorised Battalion, Naro-Fominsk
 The Independent Military Intelligence Company, Naro-Fominsk
 The Independent Signal Company, Naro-Fominsk
 The Support Company, Naro-Fominsk
 The Engineer Company, Naro-Fominsk
 The Tank Company, Naro-Fominsk
 The Artillery Battalion, Naro-Fominsk
 The Artillery Battalion, Naro-Fominsk
 The Air Defence Battalion, Naro-Fominsk

Personnel and equipment 
The 423rd Guards Yampolsky Motor Rifle Regiment had approximately 1692 personnel in active service.

Equipment Summary
 BMP-2 — 85
 BRM-1K — 5
 BTR-80 — 6
 2S3 Akatsiya — 27
 MTLB- 3
 BMP-1KSh-8
 T-80- 17

References

External links
 

 

Ground Forces regiments of the Russian Federation
Infantry units and formations of Russia
Regiments of the Soviet Union
Military units and formations established in 1942
Military units and formations disestablished in 2009